KECR (910 AM) is a radio station licensed to El Cajon, California and serving the San Diego radio market.  It is owned by Family Radio and carries a Christian talk and teaching radio format, along with traditional hymns and worship music.  Programming comes from the Family Radio Network, based in Nashville.

KECR airs Christian teaching programs from national religious leaders such as RC Sproul, Alistair Begg, Ken Ham, John F. MacArthur, Adriel Sanchez, Dennis Rainey and John Piper.  Musical artists include Keith & Kristyn Getty, The Master's Chorale, Fernando Ortega, Chris Rice, Shane & Shane, Sovereign Grace Music and Sara Groves.

KECR broadcasts at 5,000 watts, using a directional antenna.  The transmitter site is near Moreno Avenue, north of Lakeside, California, near California State Route 67.  No local programming originates here, as the station airs the Family Radio Network continuously, except for the station identification.  It does however, have a backup radio studio at its transmission site, which is mainly used to carry out messages from the Emergency Alert System.  The seven-tower array transmitter site is shared with AM 1170 KCBQ, another Christian Radio station, owned by the Salem Media Group.

History

Early years

KDEO (1955-1970)
This station signed on in 1955. In its early years, it was a Top 40 station with the call sign KDEO.  It used the moniker "Radio Kay-dee-oh".

KDEO was the first radio station to broadcast the countdown program American Top 40 with Casey Kasem, on July 3, 1970. The premiere of the program coincided with the Independence Day holiday that year.

Magic (1971-1979)
By 1971 the station rebranded as Magic 91 (referencing its AM frequency).  On March 1, 1977, it switched its call letters to KMJC. The station continued its Top 40 format. The Magic branding would eventually end up on XHRM-FM 92.5 in 1998.

Religious era

Independent (1980-1990)
As music migrated to FM radio, the owners decided to adopt a new format.  In 1980, KMJC flipped to Christian programming, call letters' meaning to "King and Master, Jesus Christ" to match the new format. It remained independent from any religious network throughout the 1980s.

Acquisition by Family Stations (1990-1994)
On April 6, 1990, the call sign became KECH, as Family Stations began operating it. Subsequently, Family proceeded to acquire the station outright 2 years later. When the sale was consummated in 1992, it began airing programming from Family Radio.

FM station divestiture (1995-2002)
The programs were originally fed from 93.3 KECR-FM, which was soon put up for sale. Family would later change the AM station's call sign to its present KECR call letters when the simulcast ended in 1995. At that point, Jacor Communications acquired the FM station, which subsequently became a CHR station (now KHTS-FM) in 1996.

Recent History (2003-Present)
During the October 2003 Cedar Fires, part of KECR's rural transmitter site was destroyed by flames. One tower (out of seven) and an electrical shack were completely destroyed. This happened after Chief Engineer, Jeff Zimmer, foolishly, rejected a staff announcer's recommendation to mow down brush within 30 feet of the towers and transmitter shacks. Weeks later, the station transmitter site was repaired and the signal restored to full power.

FM Translator
Family Stations plans to give KECR an FM translator at 100.1 FM. An application was filed on January 28, 2018, as part of a new spectrum auction. On July 3, 2019, the Federal Communications Commission (FCC) announced that Family Radio has won the spectrum auction for a fee of $35,000.

In order for its construction permit to be issued, Family Radio must finish paying the station's mortgage.  This new translator will be located atop Mount San Miguel.

References

External links
FCC History Cards for KECR (some cards missing)

Family Radio stations
ECR
ECR
El Cajon, California